Scott Philip Johnson (born 12 July 1961) is a retired American artistic gymnast. He represented the United States at the 1984 Summer Olympics and at the 1988 Summer Olympics. He was a member of the 1984 gold medal winning team, and he was the team captain in 1988. He made history at the 1987 Pan American Games by becoming the first gymnast to win a medal on each event.

Born in Cincinnati, Ohio, Johnson was a member of the World Championship teams in 1981, 1983, 1985, and 1987. While competing for the University of Nebraska, Johnson won 11 All-American Titles. He was nominated for the James E. Sullivan Award in 1988.

References

1961 births
Living people
American male artistic gymnasts
Gymnasts at the 1984 Summer Olympics
Gymnasts at the 1988 Summer Olympics
Olympic gold medalists for the United States in gymnastics
Medalists at the 1984 Summer Olympics
Pan American Games gold medalists for the United States
Pan American Games silver medalists for the United States
Sportspeople from Cincinnati
Sportspeople from Colorado Springs, Colorado
Pan American Games medalists in gymnastics
People from Oviedo, Florida
Gymnasts at the 1987 Pan American Games
Medalists at the 1987 Pan American Games
Nebraska Cornhuskers men's gymnasts
20th-century American people